Imam Samudra (14 January 1970 – 9 November 2008), also known as Abdul Aziz, Qudama/Kudama, Fatih/Fat, Abu Umar or Heri, was an Indonesian terrorist who was convicted and executed for his role in carrying out the Christmas Eve 2000 Indonesia bombings and 2002 Bali bombings. Samudra, together with Huda bin Abdul Haq (known as Muklas) and Amrozi bin Nurhasyim (known as Amrozi) were executed together for their part in coordinating and carrying out the Bali bombings.

Early life
Samudra was born as Abdul Aziz in Serang, Banten (then part of West Java province), he was raised by a single mother as one of 12 children. Samudra graduated from an Islamic school. He left home in 1990 and did not return for a decade - and then only for a few hours before disappearing again, according to his mother.  He went to Malaysia and taught at a religious school in the south of the country in the early 1990s. Indonesian authorities say the school was run by the suspected leaders of the militant Jemaah Islamiah group - Abu Bakar Ba'aysir, the group's spiritual leader, and Riduan Isamuddin, also known as Hambali.

Bali bombings
On 12 October 2002 two bombs exploded in the Kuta tourist strip on the Indonesian island of Bali, Indonesia. One hit Paddy's Irish Bar, and the second exploded in a van outside the nearby Sari club. A total of 202 people died as a result.

A third bomb exploded near Bali's US consulate, but no one was hurt. Arrested on 21 November 2002, Samudra was about to board a ferry for Sumatra. Police believe he was the planner or "field commander" of the Bali operation.

Explaining his motives for the bombing to documentarian  from prison, Samudra stated (translated into English by Haryanto):

Trial
Samudra went on trial on 2 June 2003 and testified on 16 July 2003:

Sentence and execution
On 10 September 2003, he was found guilty for his role in the Bali bombing and sentenced to the death penalty to be executed by firing squad. Originally incarcerated in Denpasar's Kerobokan Prison, he was moved to the high-security prison island of Nusakambangan. On 20 November he lodged an appeal against his sentence.

Together with the two other bombers who received death sentences, he launched a constitutional challenge against the use of firing squads. Samudra and the two other bombers preferred beheading, saying that it was a more Islamic form of execution. Despite an initial decision by Muklas, Amrozi and Imam Samudr to not seek a Presidential pardon, on 21 August 2006, Muklas and his co-conspirators authorised their lawyers to file a last appeal which was lodged on 7 December on the basis of retroactive legislation. On 25 September 2008, the Supreme Court of Indonesia rejected the final appeals of Imam Samudra and Mukhlas; having dismissed Amrozi's appeal earlier that month. In October 2008, he remained unrepentant and claimed revenge would be taken for his death. During the month, his final appeals were rejected and the Attorney General's office announced that he would be executed by firing squad in early November 2008.

According to a source in Indonesia's Attorney General Office, the execution was to be done before the end of Sunday, 9 November 2008. This was reportedly delayed from the original plan to allow a representative from the family to identify the body post-execution. However, no representative from Samudra's family were in attendance.

Samudra, along with Amrozi and Huda bin Abdul Haq were executed by firing squad at 00:15 local time on 9 November 2008.

Published works
From his cell, he wrote an autobiography titled I Fight Terrorists (Aku Melawan Teroris in Indonesian), where the "terrorists" are the Americans. It went on sale for 3, on a run of 5,000 copies. In 2004, CNN described the book as a "bestseller in Indonesia".

See also

List of terrorist incidents in Indonesia
Terrorism in Indonesia

References

External links
Death row bomber plotted new attack on smuggled laptoprequires login

1970 births
2008 deaths
Jemaah Islamiyah
Abdul Aziz
Terrorism in Indonesia
21st-century executions by Indonesia
Sundanese people
Executed Indonesian people
People executed by Indonesia by firing squad
Deaths by firearm in Indonesia
Executed mass murderers
Indonesian imams
Indonesian mass murderers
Indonesian Muslims
Islamist mass murderers
2002 Bali bombings
Inmates of Nusa Kambangan prison
Indonesian people convicted of murder
People convicted of murder by Indonesia